A tea stove is a specialized type of Chinese brazier or stove designed to boil water.

Styles
The basic brazier has been made of different materials and shapes throughout Chinese history.  Lu Yu had a special brazier designed just for heating water for tea, which is described in The Classic of Tea.  The Pictorial of Tea Ware, compiled by The Old Man Shenan c. 1269, is the earliest picture book on tea ware, and it depicts several types of tea stoves.

The bamboo stove also became very popular.  One example of a type of bamboo stove is kujiejun.  These were popular during Song Dynasty and Tang Dynasty and could include a bamboo windscreen which would fit on top of the brazier.

References

American Cookery. Volume 49. pp. 49–50.

External links
Article on Tang Dynasty tea stove
Tea Terms 2010 中英文茶術語

Teaware
Stoves